Anusvara is a symbol used in many Indic scripts to mark a type of nasal sound, typically transliterated . Depending on its location in the word and the language for which it is used, its exact pronunciation can vary. In the context of ancient Sanskrit, anusvara is the name of the particular nasal sound itself, regardless of written representation.

Sanskrit 
In Vedic Sanskrit, the anusvāra (lit. "after-sound" or "subordinate sound") was an allophonic (derived) nasal sound.

The exact nature of the sound has been subject to debate. The material in the various ancient phonetic treatises points towards different phonetic interpretations, and these discrepancies have historically been attributed to either differences in the description of the same pronunciation or to dialectal or diachronic variation. In a 2013 reappraisal of the evidence, Cardona concludes that these reflect real dialectal differences.

The environments in which the anusvara could arise, however, were well defined. In the earliest Vedic Sanskrit, it was an allophone of /m/ at a morpheme boundary, or of /n/ within morphemes, when it was preceded by a vowel and followed by a fricative. Later still,  gave anusvara as an alternative pronunciation in word-final sandhi, and later treatises also prescribed it at morpheme junctions and within morphemes. In the later written language, the diacritic used to represent anusvara was optionally used to indicate a nasal stop having the same place of articulation as a following plosive.

Devanagari script 
In the Devanagari script, anusvara is represented with a dot (bindu) above the letter (e.g. मं). In the International Alphabet of Sanskrit Transliteration (IAST), the corresponding symbol is ṃ (m with an underdot). Some transcriptions render notation of phonetic variants used in some Vedic shakhas  with variant transcription (ṁ).

In writing Sanskrit, the anusvara is often used as an alternative representation of the nasal stop with the same place of articulation as the following plosive. For example,  'limb (of the body)' may be written with either a conjunct, अङ्ग aṅga, or with an anusvara, अंग aṃga. A variant of the anusvara, the anunāsika or 'candrabindu', was used more explicitly for nasalized vowels, as in अँश aṃśa for  'portion'.

Hindi 
In practice, however, the two are often used interchangeably.

Word-finally it is realized as nasalization of the preceding vowel:  , "a well". It results in vowel nasalization also medially between a short vowel and a non-obstruent (  "a youth",   "a long-handled axe") and, in native words, between a long vowel and a voiceless plosive (  "tooth",   "a snake",   "tail").

It is pronounced as a homorganic nasal, with the preceding vowel becoming nasalized allophonically, in the following cases: between a long vowel and a voiced plosive (  "copper",   "silver"), between a long vowel and a voiceless plosive in loanwords (  "repressed",   "a bank",   "cashier"), and between a short vowel and an obstruent (  "to support",   "a chest").

The last rule has two sets of exceptions where the  only results in nasalization of the preceding short vowel. In such cases, the vowel is sometimes denasalized (instead of).

Marathi 
In Marathi the anusvara is pronounced as a nasal that is homorganic to the following consonant (with the same place of articulation). For example, it is pronounced as the dental nasal न् before dental consonants, as the bilabial nasal म् before bilabial consonants, etc.
Unlike in other Indic languages, in Marathi the same dot designating anusvara is also used to mark a retension of the inherent vowel (it is placed over a consonant after which the short central vowel is to be pronounced and not elided).

Nepali
In Nepali, chandrabindu and anusvara have the same pronunciation similarly to Hindi. Therefore, there is a great deal of variation regarding which occurs in any given position. Many words containing anusvara thus have alternative spellings with chandrabindu instead of anusvara and vice versa.

Other Indic script languages
Anusvara is used in other languages using Indic scripts as well, usually to represent suprasegmental phones (such as phonation type or nasalization) or other nasal sounds.

Bengali

In the Bengali script, the anusvara diacritic is written as a circle above a slanted line (ং), and represents . It is used in the name of the Bengali language বাংলা . It has merged in pronunciation with the letter ঙ uṅô in Bengali. Although the anusvara is a consonant in Bengali phonology, it is nevertheless treated in the written system as a diacritic in that it is always directly adjacent to the preceding consonant, even when consonants are spaced apart in titles or banners: বাং-লা-দে-শ baṅ-la-de-ś, not বা-ং-লা-দে-শ ba-ṅ-la-de-ś for বাংলাদেশ Bangladesh. It is never pronounced with the inherent vowel ‘ô’, and it cannot take a vowel sign (instead, the consonant ঙ uṅô is used pre-vocalically).

Burmese
In the Burmese script, the anusvara ( auk myit (့) ) is represented as a dot underneath a nasalised final to indicate a creaky tone (with a shortened vowel). Burmese also uses a dot above to indicate the  nasalized ending (called "Myanmar Sign Anusvara" in Unicode), called  thay thay tin (ံ)

Sinhala
In the Sinhala script, the anusvara is not a nonspacing combining mark but a spacing combining mark. It has circular shape and follows its base letter ( ං). It is called  in Sinhala, which means "dot". The anusvara represents  at the end of a syllable. It is used in fact, in the name of the Sinhala language සිංහල . It has merged in pronunciation with the letter ඞ ṅa in Sinhala.

Telugu
The Telugu script has full-zero (sunna) ం , half-zero (arasunna)  and visarga to convey various shades of nasal sounds. Anusvara is represented as a circle shape after a letter: క - ka and కం - kam.

Thai
The equivalent of the anusvara in the Thai alphabet is the nikkhahit (◌ํ), which is used when rendering Sanskrit and Pali texts. It is written as an open circle above the consonant (for example ) and its pronunciation depends on the following sound: if it is a consonant then the nikkhahit is pronounced as a homorganic nasal, and if it is at the end of a word it is pronounced as the Voiced velar nasal.

Anunasika
Anunasika is a form of vowel nasalization, often represented by an anusvara. It is a form of open mouthed nasalization, akin to the nasalization of vowels followed by "n" or "m" in Parisian French. When "n" or "m" follow a vowel, the "n" or "m" becomes silent and causes the preceding vowel to become nasal (pronounced with the soft palate extended downward so as to allow part or all of the air to leave through the nostrils). Anunasika is sometimes called a subdot because of its IAST representation.

In Devanagari and related orthographies, it is represented by the chandrabindu diacritic (example: माँ).

The anunasika represents the -m final in Pali.

Unicode 
Unicode encodes anusvara and anusvara-like characters for a variety of scripts:

See also
 Chandrabindu
 Tilde
 Ogonek

Notes

References

Bibliography 
 

 
 

Brahmic diacritics
Sanskrit